2010 New York City tornadoes may refer to:

 2010 Bronx tornado of July 25
 2010 Brooklyn–Queens tornadoes of September 16